Diplomatic relations between the People's Republic of China (PRC) and the Republic of Korea (South Korea) were formally established on July 1986. Before then, the PRC recognized only the Democratic People's Republic of Korea (North Korea) while South Korea in turn recognized only the Republic of China (Taiwan). South Korea was the last Asian country to establish relations with the People's Republic of China. In recent years, China and South Korea have endeavored to boost their strategic and cooperative partnership in numerous sectors, as well as promoting a high level relationship. Trade, tourism and multiculturalism, specifically, have been the most important factors of strengthening two neighbouring countries' cooperative partnership. Despite this, historical, political and cultural disputes have still played several roles on the relations between South Korea and China.

Both nations have been bound together by a shared history, including an overlap in cuisine, religion, a common language script and legal systems, and kinship ties that reach back thousands of years, especially during the Song and Ming Dynasty, where it shared a close trade and diplomatic relationship with Goryeo and the Joseon Dynasty respectively. The Ming and Joseon emerged after the invasion of the Mongols and shared close Confucian ideals in its society. Furthermore, the Ming had assisted Joseon during Toyotomi Hideyoshi's invasion of Korea, in which the Wanli Emperor sent a total of 221,500 troops. Joseon had also used Classical Chinese as a common script alongside Korean, and its central government was modelled after the Chinese system.

Contemporary relations between China and South Korea are characterized by extensive trading and economic relations. China is by far South Korea's largest trading partner, with China importing goods worth $160 billion from South Korea in 2018, which comprised 26% of South Korea's total exports. 21% of South Korea's imports also came from China, worth $107 billion in 2018. In 2015, China and South Korea signed the bilateral China–South Korea Free Trade Agreement which aimed to boost annual bilateral trade to over $300 billion, while lifting both countries' GDP. In November 2020, China and South Korea, along with 13 other Asia-Pacific nations, signed the Regional Comprehensive Economic Partnership, the largest free-trade agreement in history which covers 30% of the world's population and economic output. China, South Korea and Japan are also engaged in long-running negotiations for a trilateral free-trade agreement which would further integrate their economies.

Relations deteriorated considerably after South Korea announced its intentions to deploy THAAD, a move that China strongly opposed. China imposed an unofficial boycott on South Korea in an attempt to stop them from deploying the missile system. However, at the end of October 2017, the two countries ended the 1-year-long diplomatic dispute and have been working swiftly to get their relationship back on track since, strengthening exchanges and cooperation between each other, creating harmony of interests, and agreed to resume exchanges and cooperation in all areas. All economic and cultural bans from China towards South Korea were also lifted as a result, with political and security cooperation, businesses and cultural exchanges between the two countries getting back to healthy state.

Upon the relationship's resumption, China and South Korea have been organizing presidential and governmental visits, working together on the Korean Peninsula, assisting with the development of other countries, and cooperating in numerous areas.

Description 
In 1983, relations between China and South Korea were normalized, deepening economic and political ties. Since then, China and South Korea had upgraded their relationship in five phases: In 1983, it was a “friendly cooperative relationship”; in 1998, it was called a “collaborative partnership for the 21st century”; in 2003, it was described as a “comprehensive cooperative partnership”; in 2008, it was considered a “strategic cooperative partnership”; and in 2014 it was called an “enriched strategic cooperative partnership”.

Since 2004, China is the main trade partner of Korea and is considered a key player for the improvement of inter-Korean relationships. South Korea is perceived by China as the weakest link in the US alliance network in Northeast Asia. North Korea's nuclear issue and U.S. military support to South Korea have been the main threats to bilateral ties in recent years.

During the presidency of Park Geun-Hye, it was restored “balanced diplomacy”, which President Moon Jae-in has also followed. South Korea has avoided in recent years supporting the United States statements against China to avoid conflict.

History of relations

Background

Korean War

The newly established People's Republic of China participated in the Korean War between 1950 and 1953, sending the People's Volunteer Army to fight alongside the Soviet Union against the United States and United Nations troops in October 1950. It successfully drove the UN forces out of North Korea, but its own offensive into the South itself was repelled. The participation of the PVA strained relations between South Korea and China. The Korean War concluded in July 1953, resulting in the establishment of the Korean Demilitarized Zone, and the eventual withdrawal of Chinese forces from the Korean Peninsula. However, US troops have still remained in South Korea to this day.

Cold War
Throughout the Cold War, there were no official relations between the PRC and ROK. The PRC maintained close relations with North Korea, and South Korea maintained diplomatic relations with the Republic of China in Taiwan. This hindered trade between Seoul and Beijing, because South Korea was unable to protect its citizens and business interests in China without some form of international agreements. Beijing's economic needs involving South Korea were initially eclipsed by those of Moscow.

Relations under Park and Chun (1961–1983)
President Park Chung-hee initiated and President Chun Doo-hwan advanced a policy of establishing relations with China and the Soviet Union, and attempting to improve those with North Korea. China and the USSR had significant sway in determining the future of the Korean Peninsula. Good relations with old allies of North Korea were therefore integral to the Nordpolitik policy.

Seoul's official contact with Beijing started by the landing of a hijacked CAAC Flight 296 in May 1983. China sent a delegation of thirty-three officials to Seoul to negotiate its return. This marked the beginning of a series of casual exchanges of citizens. For example, in March 1984, a South Korean tennis team visited Kunming for a Davis Cup match with a Chinese team. In April 1984, a thirty-four-member Chinese basketball team arrived in Seoul to participate in the Eighth Asian Junior Basketball Championships. Some Chinese officials reportedly paid quiet visits to South Korea to inspect its industries, while South Korean officials visited China to attend a range of international conferences.

Late 1980s
Active South Korean-Chinese individual contacts have been encouraged. Academics, journalists, and particularly families divided between South Korea and China were able to exchange visits freely in the late 1980s. Significant numbers of citizens of each country reside in the other. , more than 600,000 PRC citizens reside in South Korea, of whom 70% are ethnic Koreans from the Yanbian Korean Autonomous Prefecture in China's Jilin Province and other parts of China, while roughly 560,000 South Korean citizens lived in China.

Post Cold War and Reform and Opening Up
Trade between the two countries continued to increase nonetheless, especially after the PRC's reform and opening up. Furthermore, China has attempted to mediate between North Korea and the US; between North Korea and Japan; and also initiated and promoted tripartite talks—between Pyongyang, Seoul, and Washington.

South Korea had been an ally of the Republic of China. But in 1983 diplomatic ties between Seoul and Taipei were nevertheless severed. In August 1992 formal diplomatic relations were established between Seoul and Beijing. A peace treaty was also signed at the ceremony declaring an official end of hostilities between South Korea and China as a result of the 1953 Korean Armistice Agreement. On September 3, 1994, China withdrew from the Military Armistice Commission at Panmunjom, which left only North Korea and the United Nations Command as the only participants in the Korean Armistice Agreement. South Korea never signed the agreement. By 2004 China had become South Korea's leading trading partner.

After the KORUS FTA (United States-Korea Free Trade Agreement) was finalized on 30 June 2007, the Chinese government immediately began seeking an FTA agreement with South Korea. The China-Republic of Korea Free Trade Agreement was finalized on December 20, 2015. Tariffs on 958 products including medical equipment, transformers, etc. were eliminated. On 1 January 2016, tariffs were eliminated on 5,779 products for 2 years. Also, in 10 years it is estimated that the Chinese tariffs will gradually go down and be eliminated on 5,846 products. South Korea has been running a trade surplus with China, which hit a record US$32.5 billion in 2009 and total trade between the two nations surpassed US$300 billion in 2014.

On 29 November 2010, a United States diplomatic cables leak mentioned two unknown Chinese officials telling then Vice-Foreign Minister Chun Yung-woo that the PRC would favor a Korea reunified under the South's government, as long as it was not hostile to China.

It was announced on 10 January 2011 that the Ministry of Foreign Affairs and Trade (MOFAT) established two teams of China experts and language specialists under its department handling Chinese affairs in an effort to strengthen diplomacy. An analytical team will report on political, economic and foreign affairs developments in China, and a monitoring team consisting of seven language specialists will report on public sentiment in China. The Institute of Foreign Affairs and National Security (IFANS), a think-tank affiliated to MOFAT, also launched a centre dedicated to China affairs, which will act as a hub to collate research on China undertaken in Korea.

The Park-Xi summit in 2013 showed promise of warming relations, but this quickly chilled after China extended their Air Defense Identification Zone (East China Sea) over South Korean territory. Despite this, in July 2014, Xi visited South Korea before its traditional ally North Korea, and in their talks, both leaders affirmed their support for a nuclear-free Korean peninsula and the ongoing free trade agreement negotiations. Both leaders also expressed their concerns over Japanese Prime Minister Shinzō Abe's reinterpretation of Article 9 of the Japanese Constitution.

On 23 March 2021, Chinese leader Xi Jinping and South Korean President Moon Jae-in agreed to promote dialogue between the two countries, to reschedule a visit by Xi to South Korea that was postponed last year due to the pandemic, and to work out a blueprint for the development of bilateral ties over the next three decades.

In May 2021, Moon issued a statement remarking that South Korea would work with the United States on stability in Taiwan, which provoked a warning from China.

On December 23, 2021, it was reported that senior South Korean diplomats, including Vice Foreign Minister Choi Jong-kun will hold talks online with Chinese diplomats. Zhao Lijian, a Chinese government spokesperson said that he hoped the meeting could "have a positive effect on enhancing communication and mutual trust and the promotion of bilateral relations". Just a week earlier, Taiwanese Digital Minister Audrey Tang revoked an invitation to speak at a press conference in Seoul.

Tensions between South Korea and China

Illegal fishing from China
Since 2016, Chinese vessels with the proper authorisation have been allowed to fish in South Korean waters, but illegal fishing has become a recent point of contention. Numerous incidents of violent clashes between the South Korean coast guard and Chinese crew members have been reported, and roughly 2,200 Chinese vessels were reported to have been stopped and fined by South Korea for illegal fishing from 2012 to 2016. In December 2010, the crew of a Chinese trawler clashed with a Korean patrol ship, leaving one fisherman dead, two missing, and four coast guards injured.

In October 2016, South Korea lodged a formal complaint with Beijing accusing Chinese fishing boats of ramming and sinking a South Korean coast guard vessel. The incident occurred on 7 October when South Korean coast guard officers were trying to stop about 40 Chinese fishing boats from suspected illegal fishing off South Korea's west coast. The incidents of illegal Chinese entry continued and on 1 November 2016, South Korea ships opened fire on illegal Chinese boats. No casualties were reported.

Deployment of THAAD in South Korea

Background 

In late 2016, the United States and South Korea jointly announced the deployment of the Terminal High-Altitude Area Defense (THAAD), in response to nuclear and missile threats by North Korea. The move drew opposition from China and Russia. The U.S. states that the deployment of the THAAD is “purely a defensive measure… only aimed at North Korea” and has no intention to threaten China's security interests. But China has continuously expressed its opposition over South Korea and U.S.’s decision because of its concern that the deployment of THAAD might be a measure by the U.S. to contain China.

According to Reuters:“It was China, not North Korea, that was the most uncomfortable with the idea of deploying THAAD in South Korea,” said Yang Uk, a military expert at the Korea Defense and Security Forum. Beijing opposed THAAD and its powerful radar that can see deeply into Chinese territory, saying it upsets the regional security balance.

Opposition from China 

Stating that the THAAD will undermine China's own nuclear deterrent capability, China’s Ambassador Qiu Guohong warned that the deployment of THAAD could “destroy” the China–South Korea ties in an instant, whereas the spokesperson of the president of South Korea warned China that deploying the THAAD is a “matter we will decide upon according to our own security and national interests."

For aims of a détente (a relaxation of tension), China and South Korea held a summit in Hangzhou, eastern China, on Sept. 5, 2016 with each party's leaders, CCP General Secretary Xi Jinping and Representative Park Geun-Hye to discuss the issue of THAAD. During the summit, Park reemphasized that the THAAD deployment is only to be aimed against North Korea and that there should be no reason for China's security interest to be concerned. However, Xi reiterated China's firm stance against the deployment of THAAD stating that it could “intensify disputes". Yet, the two countries still emphasized the long history of their relationship and agreed that a stable and healthy bilateral relationship will benefit both countries.

Effect of THAAD on South Korea's economy 

With South Korea's decision in 2017 to accept the deployment of THAAD in the country, although China's government shied away from formal sanctions and measures, it has urged its citizens through official media to express their displeasure and ill will at South Korea over the move. Chinese citizens were allowed to gather to protest. The news media has reported of citizen boycotts of South Korean products like Hyundai cars, of South Korean goods being removed from supermarket shelves, and tourists and travel companies canceling trips to South Korea.

South Korean conglomerate Lotte Group became a particular focus. Lotte had agreed to an exchange of land, a golf course in Seongju, with the South Korean government that will be used for the THAAD deployment. In addition to a consumer boycott of Lotte stores in China, municipal authorities suddenly discovered that Lotte stores and factories to be in contravention of fire safety regulations and other local ordinances which has resulted in the closure of 75 out of 99 Lotte supermarkets.

March sales of Hyundai and its sister brand Kia Motors in China plunged 52 per cent from a year earlier to 72,000 vehicles, the lowest level since 2014. Chinese tourism also dropped 39.4% (compared to March 2016) in March. Opinion polls conducted in South Korea found less favorable perceptions of China.

To relieve the economic strain the informal Chinese sanctions placed on South Korea, president Moon promised “three No-s,” saying that he would not participate in the US missile defense system, that he was not considering the additional deployment of THAAD, and that Japan-US-Korea security cooperation would not develop into a military alliance.

Culture 
Korean culture, singers, actors and dancers are popular with Chinese youth because of the development of the internet and export of Korean cultural content. After the THAAD dispute took place, a "Korea limitation order" was placed upon Hallyu. In China, Hallyu cultural events were canceled, Korean actors had to quit from their works and limited Korean media could be exported to China. The ban was lifted soon after, and relations cooled.

BTS Korean War controversy
On 13 October 2020, RM, a member and also leader of South Korean boy group BTS, made a speech about the Korean War, where he told South Korea shared history of pains with the United States. This caused uproar in China, and Chinese-run media lashed out at BTS for what they perceived as bias and insensitivity to China's role on the other side of the conflict, and some Chinese netizens have called to boycott Korean popular culture. This has led to backlash among some Korean netizens who accused China of exaggerating the situation.

Historical controversies
The Chinese historical claims surrounding Goguryeo created some tension between Korea and the PRC. The PRC government has recently begun the Northeast Project, a controversial research project claiming Goguryeo to be a Chinese tributary state. This sparked a massive uproar in South Korea when the project was widely publicized in 2004. Chinese motives for launching the project have reportedly been irredentism pushed by some South Koreans over China's Northeast provinces and North Korea's UNESCO application for registering Koguryo Tomb murals as its first world heritage site. To counter the Northeast Project, South Korea's government launched the Koguryo Research Foundation and in 2007 rewrote the Korean Bronze Age in history textbooks to have started in 2000 B.C. rather than 1000 B.C.

Tensions from Goguryeo have also involved Baekdu Mountain, with claims made by South Korean activists and scholars that the mountain is Korean territory. In 2009, irredentism reportedly expressed by many South Korean tourists to the Chinese side of the mountain had irked local hosts. In 2014, celebrities Kim Soo-hyun and Gianna Jun received backlash after appearing in an ad for Chinese bottled water company Hengda bingquan because Hengda listed the source of its water as "Jang bai shan" (Changbai Mountain) instead of the Korean name. Both actors then sought to revoke their ad contracts but Kim later decided to continue with the ad, disappointing many of his fans.

On 14 October 2020, South Korean media outlet JTBC discovered that a number of American schools' textbooks have taught Korea as part of China and only gained independence from China in 1876, causing uproars and criticisms that China is trying to manipulate history of Korea and U.S. schools were complicit on neglecting the education. JTBC crew also discovered that Chinese social media like Baidu have also worked to distort Korean history and Sinicize many Korean figures (Kim Gu, Yun Dong-ju) or instead referring to them as "Chosun" rather than "Korean".

Joint stance on Japan 

Due to the Empire of Japan and atrocities committed by the Imperial Japanese Army on both Koreans and Chinese, from women who supplied sex during WWII (known as comfort women) and the Japanese colonization of Korea and Taiwan to the Nanjing Massacre and Unit 731, South Korea and China are unified in their stance against Japan and insistence on greater reparations for Japan wartime atrocities.

1910-1945 provisional ROK government 

When the Korean peninsula was colonized by Imperial Japan, the provisional government of the ROK in exile in Shanghai received the support of China.

Japanese war crimes 
Both the governments of China and South Korea take a firm stand on issues in relation to Japanese war crimes. Korea had been under Japanese rule after the collapse of the Joseon Dynasty in 1910 while the islands of Taiwan and Penghu were also under Japanese rule after they were seized from the Qing dynasty in 1895 following the First Sino-Japanese War. During the Second Sino-Japanese War, Japan invaded and occupied eastern China.

During World War II, the Imperial Japanese Army perpetrated many war crimes against both Chinese and Koreans. This has caused both to oppose the Japanese government's stance on war crimes committed during the war. Issues where both the Chinese and South Korean governments stand together include the controversial visits of Japanese politicians to the Yasukuni Shrine, the Japanese history textbook controversies, and comfort women.

An Jung-geun 
In 2014, a memorial dedicated to Korean assassin An Jung-geun was opened in the Chinese city of Harbin, where he assassinated Japanese Prime Minister Itō Hirobumi in 1909. The Japanese government protested the move, referring to An as a "terrorist".

Public opinion 

A 2013 BBC/GlobeScan poll found that 44% of Chinese had a positive view of South Korea's influence while 28% had a negative view. A 2015 survey referenced in The Hankyoreh found that 66.1% of Chinese respondents had a favourable view of South Korea. A 2021 survey conducted by scholars from Rice University, the University of British Columbia, and the Lee Kuan Yew School of Public Policy had 43% of Chinese expressing an unfavourable view of South Korea, compared to 49% expressing a favourable view.  2017 BBC poll stated a far more grim picture, with only 25% of Chinese having favourable view of South Korea while 71% expressed unfavourable views of South Korea. 

A 2019 survey from the Asan Institute for Policy Studies found that 51.4% of South Korean respondents held an unfavourable view of China, compared to 62.9% unfavourability for Japan, 47.9% for North Korea, 15.3% for the U.S. Another survey in 2019 from the Pew Research Center found that 63% of South Koreans had an unfavourable view of China. A 2020 Gallup International poll had 84% of South Koreans viewing China's foreign policy as destabilizing to the world, which was the second highest percentage out of 44 countries surveyed. 

Poor relations along with media reports and movies perpetuating a negative, criminal image of Chinese in South Korea has led to some online hate speech expressed in the top comments of major news portals. During the COVID-19 pandemic, more than half a million South Korean citizens have signed a petition lobbying the government to ban Chinese from entering the country.

See also 
 2010 Eocheong boat collision incident
 2011 Gyeongryeolbi island fishing incident
 2011 Incheon fishing incident
Chaoxianzu
 China-Japan-South Korea trilateral meeting, 2008
 Nordpolitik
 People's Republic of China-North Korea relations
 Republic of China–South Korea relations

References 

http://english.yonhapnews.co.kr/news/2017/04/16/0200000000AEN20170416002300315.html
Row With China Over Missiles Devastates South Korean Tourism
https://www.inquisitr.com/4216299/president-moon-jae-in-on-thaad-and-hallyu-efforts-are-on-to-lift-chinas-ban-on-k-pop-k-drama/
Debate on the THAAD Deployment in Korea and Policy Implications

External links
 Library of Congress, A Country Study: South Korea

 
Korea, South
Bilateral relations of South Korea
South